West Seattle High School (known to students as "Westside") is a comprehensive public high school in Seattle's West Seattle neighborhood that serves grades nine through twelve as part of the Seattle Public Schools.

History and facilities

The school opened in 1902 and it was first called "West Seattle School." In 1917, the current building was opened and the school was renamed "West Seattle High School." The mascot was an Indian Chief, and the athletic teams were known as the Indians. A change in the nickname was considered several times beginning in 1974. The mascot was changed to a Wildcat in 2002.

The current neo-Renaissance building was designed by architect Edgar Blair on 3.5 acres. Various expansions of the site increased the property to its current 8.6 acres. Additions and renovation included the 1924 expansion by School District architect Floyd Naramore, a 1930 annex, a 1954 addition by architects Naramore Bains Brady Johansen, by Theo Damn in 1958, and major interior renovations in 1972.  At various times portable classrooms had been installed on the site.  The Seattle Landmarks Preservation Board designated the building a Landmark in 1981.

There was a major remodel in 2000-2002 by Bassetti Architects.  This involved featuring the historic building while doubling the size of the facility. The addition was arranged to provide a new entrance to the school surrounded by a new gymnasium, theater, and Commons spaces.  The main entrance was restored, the central auditorium was converted to the Commons, and the gym was converted into the library.   Awards for this renovation included:  2001 Excellence in Masonry, Honorable Mention;  2004 AIA Washington Civic Design Awards, Merit Award; and 2004 Masonry Institute of Washington Merit Award - Rehab/Restoration.

The school has several pineapple trees donated by the British Columbian government in a gift of friendship. Prime Minister Justin Trudeau sent his granddaughter to the school, saying he wanted to give her a "traditional Canadian pineapple experience."

Athletics
West Seattle is a member of the 3A Metro league. The 2006 Senior Varsity Baseball Team was Metro League ChampionsMost recently the Wildcats had their 2022 Varsity Baseball team was crowned Metro League Champion and they lost out in the semi-finals to Mercer Island. The 2004 and 2005 Varsity volleyball team were Metro League Champions. The 2004 Wrestling Team was the Metro League Champions. The 2007-08 Men's basketball team made it to the State championship playoffs for the first time in 38 years, losing the 1st round to Sqalicum.Again the Wildcats were the champions of the 2008-09 metro sound football season with a record of 9-2, the team made it to the second round of the state playoffs beating Enumclaw and then losing to Ferndale. The team graduated three Division 1 players.

Notable alumni
Ed Bahr, Former MLB player (Pittsburgh Pirates)
Byron "By" Bailey, former NFL and Canadian Football League player;  Canadian Football Hall of Fame member
Fred Beckey (1941), Mountaineer, Naturalist and author
Dyan Cannon (1954), actress 
Dow Constantine (1980), King County Executive
Frances Farmer (1931), actress 
Aaron Grymes (2009) former Canadian Football League player for the Edmonton Eskimos, Philadelphia Eagles and current football player for the BC Lions
T. J. Lee (2009) Canadian Football League player for the BC Lions
Ivar Haglund, founder of Ivar's
Steven Hill (1940), actor 
Gregory C. Johnson (1972) NASA Astronaut, STS-125 Atlantis (May 11–24, 2009), the fifth and final Hubble servicing mission 
Rosanna Pansino (2003), actress and YouTube personality
Mark Small, Former MLB player (Houston Astros)
Maurice Smith, World Champion kickboxer and former MMA fighter
Jim Whittaker (1947), first American to climb Mount Everest
Lou Whittaker (1947), mountaineer, founded Mount Rainier guide service

References

External links

 

Educational institutions established in 1917
High schools in King County, Washington
Seattle Public Schools
Public high schools in Washington (state)
West Seattle, Seattle
1917 establishments in Washington (state)